Cowes is an English seaport town and civil parish on the Isle of Wight. Cowes is located on the west bank of the estuary of the River Medina, facing the smaller town of East Cowes on the east bank. The two towns are linked by the Cowes Floating Bridge, a chain ferry.

As of 2020 it had an estimated population of 14,724.

Charles Godfrey Leland's 19th-century verses describe the towns poetically as "The two great Cowes that in loud thunder roar/This on the eastern, that the western shore".

Cowes has been seen as a home for international yacht racing since the founding of the Royal Yacht Squadron in 1815. It gives its name to the world's oldest regular regatta, Cowes Week, which occurs annually in the first week of August. Later, powerboat races are held.

Much of the town's architecture is still heavily influenced by the style of ornate building that Prince Albert popularised.

History

Name
The name Westcowe was attested in 1413 as the name of one of two sandbanks, on each side of the River Medina estuary, so-called after a supposed likeness to cows. The name was subsequently transferred to fortifications built during the reign of Henry VIII on the east and west banks of the river to dispel a French invasion, referred to as cowforts or cowes. They subsequently gave their names to the towns of Cowes and East Cowes, replacing the earlier name of Shamblord.

The town's name has been subject to dispute in the past, sometimes being called Cowes, and then West Cowes. For example, a milestone from the 17th century exists, calling the town Cowes, but up until the late 19th Century the Urban District Council bore the name West Cowes. In 1895 West Cowes Urban District Council applied for permission to change the name of the town to Cowes officially, and this was granted on 21 August 1895.

Whilst the name Cowes has become well established on infrastructure related to the town (including maps, road signage and postal addresses), the name West Cowes remained on Admiralty charts, used by sailors,  until 2015, when it was corrected following a letter from a Cowes resident.

Red Funnel, the Southampton-based ferry company that provides routes from Southampton to both Cowes and East Cowes, has continued to use the name West Cowes for the town in information and publicity and as the name for the town's terminal.

Early history
In earlier centuries the two settlements were much smaller and known as East and West Shamblord or Shamelhorde, the East being the more significant settlement.

The Isle of Wight was a target of attempted French invasions, and there were notable incursions. Henrician Castles were built in both settlements in the sixteenth century. The west fort in Cowes still survives to this day, albeit without the original Tudor towers, as Cowes Castle. The fort built in East Cowes is believed to have been similar but was abandoned  and since destroyed.

The seaport at Cowes, Isle of Wight was the first stop on English soil before crossing the Atlantic Ocean with many ships loaded with Germans and Swiss passengers leaving from Rotterdam going to the New World destination of the port City of Philadelphia, Pennsylvania. These Germans and Swiss passengers were going to become British subjects in Colonial America, and the English captains made a written record of the stop in Cowes, England.

Royal patronage creates a yachting centre
It is believed that the building of an 80-ton, 60-man vessel called Rat o' Wight on the banks of the river Medina in 1589 for the use of Queen Elizabeth I sowed the seed for Cowes to grow into a world-renowned centre of boat-building. However, seafaring for recreation and sport remained the exception rather than the rule until much later. It was not until the reign of keen sailor George IV that the stage was set for the heyday of Cowes as 'The Yachting Capital of the World.' In 1826 the Royal Yacht Squadron organised a three-day regatta for the first time and the next year the king signified his approval of the event by presenting a cup to mark the occasion. This became known as Cowes Regatta and it soon grew into a four-day event that always ended with a fireworks display.

The opium clippers Nina (1852), Eamont (1853) and Wild Dayrell (1854) were built in Cowes.

Great houses

In Cowes the 18th-century house of Westbourne was home to a collector of customs whose son, born there in 1795, lived to become Dr Thomas Arnold, headmaster of Rugby School.

Northwood House was the home of the Ward family. It was donated under trust to the town in 1929, the grounds becoming Northwood Park.  William George Ward was a close friend of the poet Tennyson and in whose memory the poet wrote six lines.

Cowes and East Cowes became a single urban district in 1933.

World War II and the Błyskawica
During an air raid of World War II on 4/5 May 1942, the local defences had been fortuitously augmented by the Polish destroyer Błyskawica (itself built by J. Samuel White in East Cowes), which put up such a determined defence that, in 2002, the crew's courage was honoured by a local commemoration lasting several days to mark the 60th anniversary of the event. In 2004 an area of Cowes was named Francki Place in honour of the ship's commander. The Friends of the ORP Błyskawica Society is active in Cowes. There is a Błyskawica Memorial.

Economy

Industry in both Cowes and East Cowes has always centred on the building and design of marine craft and materials associated with boat-making, including the early flying boats, and sail-making. It is the place where the first hovercraft was tested.

Major present-day employers include BAE Systems Integrated System Technologies (Insyte), which occupies the site of the old Somerton Aerodrome at Newport Road, Cowes; and GKN Aerospace in East Cowes.

The population of the town increases dramatically during Cowes Week, the busiest time of the year for local businesses. The town was reported to be doing well in 2009, despite the economic downturn.

The high street is where most of the retail shops in the town are located. These include specialist sailing shops catering for yachting enthusiasts.

Sport and leisure

Cowes has a Non-League football club Cowes Sports F.C., which plays at Westwood Park.

Transport

 

Cowes is a gateway town for the Isle of Wight. Travellers to Southampton are served by a high speed catamaran passenger ferry from Cowes known as the Red Jet. Southern Vectis' route 1 is the main bus service in Cowes. Single decker buses branded Red1 serve the Red Jet terminal, whilst route 1 double deckers serve the M&S Foodhall at Carvel Lane (the site of the former Cowes railway station). Both run to Newport to take travellers on to other island destinations. Wightbus also ran local services around Cowes and Gurnard until 2011. The Cowes Floating Bridge connects the two towns of West Cowes and East Cowes throughout the day. It is one of a few remaining chain ferries not replaced by a physical bridge.

Cowes is the start of the Isle of Wight Coastal Path.

Cowes was once served by a rail link to and from the island's capital Newport but as part of cutbacks made on the recommendation of Dr Beeching in the 1960s the line to Newport was cut in 1966. The trackbed south of Arctic Road is now maintained as a cycle path.

Park and ride
Cowes Park and Ride is a park and ride scheme on the Isle of Wight, featuring an 85-space car park and bus stop on the outskirts of Cowes in Somerton, on a former industrial site. It is currently served by Southern Vectis buses on route 1 every 10 minutes during the day. From the park and ride, a £2.50 return journey is available to Cowes Pontoon for the Red Jet boat to Southampton. This is one of the few return journeys Southern Vectis offer.

The park and ride scheme for Cowes was launched in 2004 as part of a joint venture between the Isle of Wight Council, Southern Vectis and Red Funnel. It was built on a former council depot on the Somerton Industrial Estate. The scheme went ahead largely due to losing a car park in Denmark Road for development, resulting in a lack of parking around Cowes. During the first few weeks of operation, before any Southern Vectis routes stopped at the park and ride, a temporary shuttle service was put in place, subsidised by Red Funnel, with a 15-minute frequency timed around morning and evening peaks.

To begin with, the scheme suffered with a huge lack in the number of people using the service, receiving no passengers in its first few days of operation.

Prior to the network revision by Southern Vectis in April 2006, the park and ride was served by routes 1, 2 and 3, with routes 2 and 3 running under the Route Rouge branding. All services to Cowes served the site, with buses using Three Gates Road to pass between the two current alternate routings, except route 1, which ran via the current park and ride branch but along Mill Hill road as opposed to Newport Road.

After the network revision, routes 2 and 3 no longer served Cowes leaving only route 1 at an increased frequency of every 15 minutes to serve the site, taking passengers right to the entrance of the Red Jet terminal. Due to the higher frequency, buses no longer serve Three Gates Road to cross over the routings, so buses on the Round House leg do not serve the site.

When the scheme was first launched, the price of a return ticket was £1, however, in April 2008, the price increased for the first time, doubling to £2 by Southern Vectis. This was due to a rise in costs and substantial cut in payments for free travel by the Isle of Wight Council. This later increased again on 2 February 2009 along with other £2 fares to £2.50 as part of Southern Vectis' annual fare review.

Later in 2008, there were some instances of vandalism at the site, with one woman's car having its windows smashed after she left it in the site overnight. Police are working with the Isle of Wight Council to try to improve security at the site. The council have been told that members of the public are leaving their valuables inside cars at the site, which could be targeted by thieves.

The site was remodelled over the turn of 2009 and 2010. A new entrance was built directly off the roundabout, with a new bus stop and shelter, and a raised kerb. The previous entrance and exit was widened as an exit, and buses are now able to use the site without doing the large turn or being affected and forced to reverse by badly parked vehicles. The rearrangement also provides more spaces. A new bus shelter was due to be installed at the site on 24 November 2009, leading to the closure of the site to buses from 11am, with temporary bus stops on the main road outside, although this didn't happen as planned. The site was closed at a later date for a longer period, with buses using stops on the main road for around a month. The newly remodelled site was completed on 22 January 2010, at which point buses started to enter the site again.

Notable residents 

See :Category:People from Cowes
Louisa Susannah Aikman — British American author
 Thomas Arnold — Headmaster of Rugby School
 John Henry Corke -—four times Mayor of Portsmouth
 Uffa Fox — naval architect, author, yachtsman
 Celia Imrie — actress
 Jeremy Irons — Academy Award-winning actor
 Kenneth Kendall — journalist and broadcaster
 Albert Ketèlbey — composer, conductor and pianist
 Mark King — bassist and lead singer of Level 42
 Ellen MacArthur — solo long-distance yachtswoman
 Owen Maddock — British engineer Cooper Car Company 1950–1963
 Cliff Michelmore — BBC television and radio presenter/producer
 Alwyn Ruddock - English historian that studied 15th Century English Voyages
 Reginald Sartorius — Victoria Cross recipient
 Clement Smith — recipient of the Victoria Cross
 Alan Titchmarsh — gardener, novelist and broadcaster
 Zita of Bourbon-Parma — Empress of Austria-Hungary; educated at nearby convent

See also 
 Classic Boat Museum
 Cowes Maritime Museum
 Holy Trinity Church, Cowes
 List of current places of worship on the Isle of Wight
 St. Faith's Church, Cowes
 St. Mary's Church, Cowes

Sister Cities 
  Bulls, New Zealand
  Saint-Malo, France

References

External links 

 Cowes Harbour Commission
 Current nautical charts, Cowes and approaches
 Old postcards of Cowes, Gurnard, East Cowes and Osborne House
 The history of the Customs Service at Cowes
 Old pictures of Cowes

 
Towns on the Isle of Wight
Ports and harbours of the Isle of Wight
Civil parishes in the Isle of Wight